Eustathius or Eustace of Mtskheta (Evstat'i Mtskhet'eli) (died  550) is an Orthodox Christian saint, executed for his apostasy from Zoroastrianism by the Sasanian military authorities in Caucasian Iberia (Kartli, eastern Georgia). His story is related in the anonymous 6th-century Georgian hagiographic novel The Passion of Eustathius of Mtskheta.

One of the earliest extant works of the Georgian literature, The Passion of Eustathius of Mtskheta (მარტჳლობაჲ და მოთმინებაჲ წმიდისა ევსტათი მცხეთელისაჲ) was written by an anonymous author later in the 6th century, within thirty years of Eustathius' reported death. The morphology of the work as well as some theological phrases also supports this dating, although the earliest surviving manuscript dates from c. 1000 (Georgian National Center of Manuscripts, MSS H-341). The text is also interesting for the first Georgian formulation of the Ten Commandments, an account of the life of Jesus which recalls Tatian's Diatessaron (a Gospel harmony of the 2nd century), and traces of influence of the 2nd century Apology of Aristides. The Passion was first published by Mikhail Sabinin in 1882.

Eustathius is reported by the hagiographer to have been an Iranian cobbler originally called Gvirobandak, son of a high-ranking Zoroastrian priest (magi), from Ganzak. Having converted to Christianity, he flees persecution to Georgia (Iberia), then under the Iranian military authority, in 541. He settles at the Christian town of Mtskheta and marries a Christian woman. The local Iranian cobblers’ guild denounces Eustathius to the marzban Arvand Gushnasp with seven other converts to be judged. Arvand punishes the apostates by having their noses pierced and casts them in prison under sentence of death. Six months later, Arvand releases them, however, as a farewell gesture to the local people, when recalled from Georgia by the king Khosrau I. Four years later, under the new marzban Vezhan Buzmihr, Eustathius is rearrested, but reaffirms his faith before the court in a speech of some 3,000 words that makes up nearly half the Passion. Eventually, the marzban, albeit reluctant, has him beheaded in Tbilisi. The remains of Eustathius were taken to Mtskheta and buried at its principal church.

References

Sources
 

550s deaths
Saints of Georgia (country)
Georgian people of Iranian descent
Eastern Orthodox saints
Converts to Christianity from Zoroastrianism
6th-century Christian martyrs
People executed by the Sasanian Empire
Executed people from Georgia (country)
People executed for apostasy
6th-century executions
Year of birth unknown
People executed by Iran by decapitation
People from Mtskheta
6th-century Iranian people
Christians in the Sasanian Empire
Christian martyrs executed by decapitation
Persian saints
Executed Iranian people